MLK Jr. station is a DART Light Rail station in Dallas, Texas. MLK Jr. station acts as a transfer point to numerous buses at the nearby J.B. Jackson Jr. Transit Center. Since opening in 2009, ridership has grown substantially to 1,153 riders each weekday.

Location
MLK Jr. station is located within the South Dallas area, specifically at the intersection of Martin Luther King Junior Boulevard and South Trunk Avenue. The area's largest attraction is Fair Park, from which MLK Jr. station is two blocks to the south. Additionally, a number of small businesses and public facilities are in the vicinity of the station.

Transit-oriented development
As with other DART stations, particularly within the inner sections of Dallas, the City of Dallas has encouraged transit-oriented development in station-proximate parcels to boost economic development. MLK Jr. is one of the City's five prime targets for encouraging mixed-use development near DART; the station area plan released in February 2013 aims to focus growth in an "urban mixed-use area" encompassing vacant lots directly south of the station as well as designating Grand Avenue, Martin Luther King Junior Boulevard and Robert B Cullum Boulevard as corridors to upgrade to complete streets or secondary streetscape areas.

History
Upon its opening on September 14, 2009, MLK Jr. station served as the southern terminus for the Green Line until its second phase to Buckner, where it currently ends, opened on December 6, 2010.

Station layout
MLK Jr. station utilizes a side platform setup with two tracks. Pedestrian access is provided by entrances to sidewalks on Martin Luther King Junior Boulevard, South Trunk Avenue and South Boulevard.

Artwork
The station is rich with art and architecture expressing the history of the South Dallas neighborhood and the African heritage claimed by most of its residents.

References

External links 
Dallas Area Rapid Transit - J.B. Jackson Jr. Transit Center
MLK Jr. Station

Dallas Area Rapid Transit light rail stations in Dallas
Railway stations in the United States opened in 2009
2009 establishments in Texas
Railway stations in Dallas County, Texas